K2-138, also designated EPIC 245950175 or EE-1, is a large early K-type main sequence star with a system of up to 6 planets discovered by citizen scientists. Four were found in the first two days of the Exoplanet Explorers project on Zooniverse in early April 2017, while up to two more were revealed in further analysis. The system is almost 600 light years away in the constellation Aquarius, within K2 Campaign 12.

Planetary system

K2-138 is notable for its large number of planets, all found through the efforts of citizen scientists. They are designated K2-138b, c, d, e, f, and g in order from their host star. The first five were validated by Christiansen et al., while K2-138g was noted as being a likely candidate. However, since there were only two transits of it, K2-138g could not be validated. There is a possibility that the two transits for this candidate are from two individual long-period planets.

All six planets are within the Super-Earth and Mini-Neptune categories, with radii between about 1.6  to 3.3 . The outer five, including the unconfirmed K2-138g, are likely small gaseous worlds with no solid surface. However, the smaller K2-138b could be rocky. The masses of the planets remain unknown, as the data for K2-138 does not have a high enough signal-to-noise ratio for transit-timing variation (TTV) analysis. However, the Spitzer Space Telescope could be able to accurately detect TTVs and lead to the masses of the planets being calculated. Planets b through f are predicted to cause TTVs on the order of 2.5 to 7.1 minutes, for predicted masses between 4  and 7 .

The five validated planets of K2-138 are very close to the parent star and form an unbroken chain of near-3:2 resonances. Their orbital periods range from 2.35 to 12.76 days, with the unconfirmed sixth planet orbiting much further out with a period of about 41 days. K2-138b, c, d, e, and f are locked in several chains of three-body resonances, a feat shared by only a handful of systems, including TRAPPIST-1 and Kepler-80. Like the former, K2-138 could show the end result of slow, inward disk migration.

Spitzer observations of K2-138g were announced on the AAS Meeting #233. The iPoster shows an updated radius of K2-138g of 3.7 , making it the largest planet in the system. This result was preliminary  until being confirmed in February 2021.

A team of astronomers collected 215 spectra over 79 nights with the instrument HARPS mounted on the ESO 3.6 m Telescope. With a Bayesian analysis of the K2 photometry and HARPS radial-velocities (RVs) the team were able to constrain the mass of planet b to e. The bulk densities of the planets range from Earth-like density for planet b to Neptune-like density for planet e. The masses and densities constrain the composition of the planets. They have likely rocky cores and a substantial atmospheric layer, composed of volatiles. For planet f and g this team was able to constrain the upper limit of the mass to 8.7 and 25.5 earth masses.

A paper by Acuña et al. studied the water content of the K2-138 system, assuming a volatile layer constituted of water in steam and supercritical phases. They find that the planet b has an upper water-mass-fraction of 0.7% and is a volatile-poor planet. Planet b could have formed with a thick water atmosphere that was blown away by XUV-radiation coming from the host star. A process called photoevaporation. 

Planet f is possibly the most water-rich planet in the system, with an upper water-mass-fraction of 66%. The radius of planet g is larger than a planet with a water-rich composition and the researchers conclude that planet g has an atmosphere rich in hydrogen and helium and in this case the upper volatile-mass fraction would be only 5%. All planets of the system likely have a less massive core compared to earth.

K2-138 was selected as a target by ESA in the first Announcement of Opportunity (AO-1) Program of the CHEOPS mission, which was launched in December 2019. For 87.6 orbits the spacecraft will record the transits to measure TTVs of the planets. K2-138 could become a benchmark system to compare RV and TTV masses. The system is also a good candidate to search for co-orbital bodies, which are predicted to exist and to be stable in resonant chain systems like K2-138.

See also
 Amateur exoplanet discoveries
 K2-288Bb, another planet found by citizen scientists from Exoplanet Explorers
 Kepler-86
 Kepler-90
 PH1b
 TRAPPIST-1

References

Aquarius (constellation)
K-type main-sequence stars
J23154776-1050590
 Planetary systems with six confirmed planets